is a Japanese manga and toyline created by Hiro Morita, originally based on Takara Tomy's Beyblade franchise. The third incarnation of the franchise after the Metal Fight series, the Beyblade Burst toyline launched on July 15, 2015, while the original manga was serialized in Shogakukan's children's manga magazine CoroCoro Comic from August 2015 to December 2021 and is compiled into twenty tankōbon volumes. Shogakukan's South East Asian branch began publishing it in English in April 2017.

An anime adaptation by OLM premiered on all TXN stations in Japan on April 4, 2016. ADK Emotions NY, Inc. licensed the anime and Hasbro licensed the toyline in English; marking the first time in the franchise that an English adaptation wasn't produced by Nelvana. The first two series were originally recorded between Vancouver, British Columbia and Calgary, Alberta in Canada by Ocean Productions and its sister studio Blue Water. Since the third series; the franchise has been recorded in Los Angeles, California in the United States by Bang Zoom! Entertainment. The dub would be one of the final anime voice acting roles of Gabe Khouth who died two years later.

The first two seasons were released on DVD from Cinedigm on October 1, 2019. Season 3 was released on February 11, 2020.

Plot

Beyblade Burst (2016–17)
The story revolves around Valt Aoi and Shu Kurenai as well as his classmates at the Beigoma Academy school in Japan. When not studying, the close friends are obsessed with their Bey tops, creating a school bey club and challenging each other to battles at their Bey Stadium. The friends eventually become rivals as they compete against each other in a competition to claim the title of Japan's top Blader.

Beyblade Burst Evolution (2017–18)
Valt Aoi, who hails from Japan was a top competitor in the Japanese Championship, is scouted for the prestigious Spanish team "BC Sol" and heads out to Spain. When he arrives in Spain, he runs into some old friends and meets some new ones who end up accompanying him along his journey. Valt's first battle in Spain leaves his bey, Valtryek, with an opportunity to evolve, making it stronger. Valt and his friends set their sights on becoming the World Champion; however, in order to qualify, they must first take the European League by winning team battles against other teams from around the globe. After the victory of BC Sol in the World League, Valt competes in the tournament for the International Blader's Cup.

Beyblade Burst Turbo (2018–19)
Two years after the International Blader's Cup, the story focuses on Aiger Akabane, a "wild child" that grew up in nature. After battling No.1 Blader in the world "Valt Aoi", he became inspired to become the No.1 Blader in the world, along with his beyblade, Z Achilles. He aims to fight strong opponents in an effort to become stronger himself. To defeat Legendary Blader Valt Aoi and become the World Champion, Aiger begins his journey.

Beyblade Burst Rise (2019–20)
Legendary Blader Valt Aoi has been training the next generation of elite Bladers at Spain's BC Sol. One day, rookie Bladers Dante Koryu and Delta Zakuro witness Valt unleashing his newly evolved Gamma Bey, Sword Valtryek. To their surprise, Valtryek radiates a golden light as it rockets around the stadium. Inspired by the limitless possibilities of this "Hyper-Flux" state, both Dante and Delta seek the same bond with their Beys.

Dante and his partner, Ace Dragon, set off for Japan, the birthplace of Beyblade. But the path to glory won't be easy; plenty of tough competitors and Gamma Beys stand in their way, among them some of the best to ever let it rip. Dante soon realizes he'll have to do whatever it takes to deepen his bond with Dragon.

Do Dante and Dragon have what it takes to overcome these challenges? And will they ever achieve Hyper-Flux? Here begins the story of Dante and Dragon's rise to the peak of the Blading world.

Beyblade Burst Surge (2020–21)
From high atop the Blading world reign the Blading Legends, a select group of Bladers who set the standard to which all other hopefuls aspire. No challenger yet has succeeded in breaking through their ranks.

A legend of legends, Valt Aoi hosts an exhibition match featuring a revolutionary class of Bey: "Lightning Beys". Inspired by the battle, Hizashi brothers, Hyuga and Hikaru Hizashi, issue a challenge: armed with their solar Beys Hyperion and Helios, this unlikely duo is going to topple Beyblade's ruling elite.

As the Hizashi brothers' challenge envelops the world's Blading legends, a new tournament is born to determine who among them is truly the best. In the middle of this mayhem, there lurks a unique Blader shrouded in mystery.

Beyblade Burst QuadDrive (2021–22)
The story centers on Bel Daizora, the leader of the Bey graveyard "Phantom's Gate". Bel, who holds Destruction Belfyre, declares war on Bladers across the world. With Ranzo Kiyama and Bashara Suiro, their journey unfolds as Bel advances to becoming the Dark Prince.

Characters
 Valt Aoi / 

The main protagonist of Beyblade Burst and Burst Evolution. An energetic boy who dreams of being a world champion.

 / 

Valt's childhood best friend and main rival. He is also one of the Supreme Four and the owner of the beyblade team called Raging Bulls.

Also known as  The Head Honcho or Honcho / . Rantaro is a member of Beigoma Academy BeyClub and BC Sol as well as a coach for The Bombers. He is also Ranjiro's older brother.

Aiger Akabane / 

The main protagonist of Burst Turbo. A hot-headed 11-year old boy who dreams to become the world's strongest blader after witnessing the strength of Legendary Blader "Valt Aoi".

 Fubuki Sumiye / 

Leader of Beigoma Academy BeyClub until he leaves for America.

 Dante Koryu / 

The main protagonist of Burst Rise and a member of Victories.

Arman Kusaba / 

A member of Victories and older brother of Taka Kusaba.

Delta Zakuro / 

One of the Risen 3 and a new member of the Victories
Hikaru Hizashi / 

One of the two main protagonists of Burst Surge and Hyuga's older brother.

Hyuga Hizashi / 
 
One of the two main protagonists of Burst Surge and Hikaru's younger brother.

Lain Valhalla / 
 
The main antagonist of Burst Surge and Shu's former student.

The main protagonist of Burst QuadDrive. Also known as the Dark Prince /  and leader of the Bey graveyard "Phantom's Gate".

A blader from Brazil. He's a cousin of both Rantaro and Ranjiro.

The main antagonist of Burst QuadDrive. Also known as the High Prince /  and the member of BC Sol.

Media

Manga
On November 15, 2021, it was announced that the manga would end on December 15, 2021.

Anime

An anime television series adaptation was announced on June 18, 2015, by D-rights and Takara Tomy. The anime is produced by OLM and directed by Katsuhito Akiyama with character designs by Toshiaki Ōhashi and Hideki Sonoda handling series composition. The anime aired on TXN between April 4, 2016, and March 27, 2017. An English dub of the anime premiered on Teletoon in Canada on September 10, 2016 and on Disney XD on October 2. The dub premiered on 9Go! in Australia on 5 December 2016 and on Disney XD in the United States on December 19, 2016. An English subtitled version began streaming on Daisuki in the United States on December 27, 2016, from 9:30 am, until the website went defunct in 2017.

On February 11, 2017, it was announced that the anime television series was confirmed for a second season, titled Beyblade Burst God. The season is directed by Kentaro Yamaguchi with Katsuhito Akiyama serving as chief director. Hideki Sonoda and Toshiaki Ōhashi are returning from Beyblade Burst for series composition and character design, respectively. Hiroki Matsuoka is the sound effects director, and Zain Effendi is composing the music. The second season aired between April 3, 2017, and March 26, 2018. An English dub of the anime premiered on Teletoon in Canada on November 4, 2017 and on Disney XD in the United States on December 4, 2017.

On February 8, 2018, it was announced that the anime television series was confirmed for a third season, titled Beyblade Burst Chōzetsu. The main staff for the previous series are returning at OLM. The third season aired between April 2, and March 25, 2019. An English dub of the anime premiered on Teletoon in Canada on October 7, 2018 and on Disney XD in the United States on December 15, 2018.

On February 15, 2019, it was announced that the anime television series was confirmed for a fourth season, titled Beyblade Burst GT. The series streamed weekly on the CoroCoro YouTube channel, the official Beyblade portal website, and the Takara Tomy Channel between April 5, 2019, and March 27, 2020. Katsuhito Akiyama is the show's chief director, and Ojing is directing the series at OLM. Hideki Sonoda is returning to oversee the series scripts, and Toshiaki Ōhashi is returning to design the characters. d-rights is producing the series. An English dub of the anime premiered on Disney XD in the United States on February 8, 2020.

On March 13, 2020, it was announced that the anime television series was confirmed for a fifth season, titled Beyblade Burst Sparking. The anime aired from April 3, 2020, to March 19, 2021, on the CoroCoro Channel and the Takara Tomy Channel on YouTube. Katsuhito Akiyama is the chief director, and Jin Gu Oh is directing the anime at OLM. Hideki Sonoda is overseeing the series scripts, and Toshiaki Ōhashi is the character designer. An English dub of the anime premiered on Disney XD in the United States on February 20, 2021.

On December 15, 2020, it was announced that the anime television series was confirmed for a sixth season titled Beyblade Burst Dynamite Battle. The anime aired between April 2, 2021, and March 18, 2022, on the CoroCoro Channel and the Takara Tomy Channel on YouTube. Katsuhito Akiyama is the chief director, and Jin Gu Oh is directing the anime at OLM. Hideki Sonoda is overseeing the series scripts, and Toshiaki Ōhashi is the character designer. Frederik Weidmann is composing the music. An English dub of the anime premiered on Disney XD and DisneyNOW in the United States on December 4, 2021.

On December 2, 2022, it was announced a seventh season Beyblade Burst QuadStrike will be released for the international market in spring 2023.

Merchandise
Hasbro and Sunrights are launching the toyline outside of Japan. Toys R Us started distributing the toys in Canada in September 2016 and Hasbro started distributing the toys in the United States in January 2017.

Notes

References

External links

Official Beyblade: Burst website 

2015 manga
2016 anime television series debuts
2017 anime television series debuts
2018 anime television series debuts
Beyblade
2019 anime ONAs
2020 anime ONAs
2021 anime ONAs
2023 anime ONAs
Japanese children's animated action television series
Japanese children's animated science fantasy television series
Japanese children's animated sports television series
Children's manga
OLM, Inc.
Shogakukan manga
TV Tokyo original programming
Animated television series about children